In linguistics, critical language awareness (CLA) refers to an understanding of social, political, and ideological aspects of language, linguistic variation, and discourse. It functions as a pedagogical application of a critical discourse analysis (CDA), which is a research approach that regards language as a social practice. Critical language awareness as a part of language education teaches students how to analyze the language that they and others use. More specifically, critical language awareness is a consideration of how features of language such as words, grammar, and discourse choices reproduce, reinforce, or challenge certain ideologies and struggles for power and dominance.

Regarding linguistic variation, Fairclough argued that it is insufficient to teach students to use "appropriate" language without considering why that language is preferred and who makes that decision (as well as the implications for speakers who do not use "appropriate language").

CLA generally includes consideration of how a person may be marginalized by speaking a particular way, especially if that way of speaking serves as an index of their race, ethnicity, religion, social status, etc.

Because power is reproduced through language, CLA is "a prerequisite for effective democratic citizenship, and should therefore be seen as an entitlement for citizens, especially children developing towards citizenship in the educational system".

Applications 
Critical language awareness has been applied to educating students in South Africa how language was used to maintain and perpetuate the apartheid state.

It has also been applied to present small groups of children with tasks which encourage a focus on the similarities and differences between languages.

See also

 Critical applied linguistics
 Critical discourse analysis
 Critical pedagogy
 Political correctness

References

External links
 Addressing Political “Confusion Syndrome” Discourses: A Critical Applied Linguistics Perspective, Petra Christian University
 Critical Language Awareness (CLA) and EFL

Critical theory
Linguistics
Sociolinguistics